Peter Dowd may refer to:

Peter Dowd (born 1957), British politician
Peter Dowd (academic) (born 1946), Australian professor of Mining Engineering